Callanga is a genus of longhorn beetles of the subfamily Lamiinae, containing the following species:

 Callanga tenebrosa Lane, 1973
 Callanga trichocera Lane, 1973

References

Hemilophini